Terminator X: A Laser Battle for Salvation (often shortened to just Terminator X) is a themed indoor laser skirmish attraction created by Lynton V. Harris of Sudden Impact Entertainment. The attraction is currently located at Sunway Lagoon in Petaling Jaya, Malaysia and at Six Flags México on February 3, 2011.

History
The first Terminator X attraction debuted at the Royal Adelaide Show in Australia in 2009. It was then moved to Adventure World in Perth, Western Australia later that year for the summer season. In early 2010, that particular installation was shipped to the United States. By May 2010, the attraction had opened at both La Ronde in Montreal, Canada, and at Sunway Lagoon in Petaling Jaya, Malaysia. In November 2010, Six Flags announced that they would open the attraction at Six Flags México in 2011.

Attraction
Groups of 30 guests enter a briefing room. Each player is given instructions and battle gear in this room. They are then ushered into the themed arena where the combat takes place. For approximately five minutes two teams of 15 not only battle against each other but also against the intelligent arena and against 12 characters from the Terminator franchise.

See also
 AVPX - Sudden Impact Entertainment's first laser skirmish attraction
 2011 in amusement parks

References

External links
Terminator X on the official La Ronde website 
Terminator X on the official Sunway Lagoon website
Terminator X on the official Sudden Impact Entertainment website 

Terminator (franchise)
Laser tag
Amusement rides introduced in 2009
Amusement rides introduced in 2010
Amusement rides introduced in 2011
Amusement rides manufactured by Sudden Impact! Entertainment Company
Six Flags México
La Ronde (amusement park)
Amusement rides based on film franchises